Society of Soul was a five-member R&B group that consisted of the members of Organized Noize (Sleepy Brown, Rico Wade and Ray Murray) as well as Espraronza and Big Rube.

Discography

Albums 
Brainchild (1995)

Singles 
"Pushin'"
"Embrace"

References

External links

Southern hip hop groups
Dungeon Family members
Arista Records artists